The first season of the reality television show, Storage Wars aired on A&E from December 1, 2010 to April 20, 2011. It consisted of 19 episodes, beginning with the "High Noon in the High Dessert" and ending with "Live and Let Bid".

Seventeen of the episodes for season one of Storage Wars were filmed at various self-storage facilities throughout Southern California, including Mini-U Storage, Storage Outlet and Extra Storage. Two special episodes were filmed on location at a pair of StorageOne facilities in Las Vegas, Nevada.

Episode overview

Episode statistics
Although revealed at the end of the episode, the totals are not always reflective and exact of the value of items in the lockers. In the episode "Senior Center Showdown", Barry failed to buy a unit, but he was given a credit of $30.00, because he later bet his day's budget on a game of bridge, and won. In many cases, the values of items are estimates made on the spot by the cast members, and are not necessarily actual profits or losses. Some of the episodes were not aired in the order that they were filmed. Therefore, the * column in each season's episode list indicates the sequential order of that episode.

Notes
 1 Barry forgot there was an auction in Cerritos before he came.
 2 It was revealed at the end of the episode that despite not spending any money at the auction, Barry bet his entire budget for the day at a bridge tournament, which earned him a profit of $30.00.
 3 Darrell bought a unit for $400.  And after he looked through the unit for profitable items, he soon gives it to Dave for free because he thought there was no money to be made on the unit.  Later after Dave gets the unit, he ends up making money on the unit he got from Darrell.
 4 Although Dave did not attend the auction in Riverside, Barry donated a collection of fur coats to him, as he did not wish to keep/sell them. Dave made an overall profit of $648.00 on the collection of coats.
 5 This locker was bought by Dave's son, Dave Hester Jr.

References

External links
 Storage Wars Zap2it Episode List

Season 1